John Boyd Avis (July 11, 1875 – January 21, 1944) was a United States district judge of the United States District Court for the District of New Jersey.

Education and career

Avis was born in Deerfield, New Jersey, the son of a New Jersey assemblyman, and the great-great grandson of a Revolutionary War soldier who had fought at Valley Forge. He read law from 1890 to 1894 with John S. Mitchell and from 1897 to 1898 with David O. Watkins in Woodbury, New Jersey. Avis married Minnie G. Anderson on September 27, 1899.

In 1900, he and Watkins became partners, and the partnership lasted until 1907, from which time Avis practiced alone until his appointment to the bench in 1929. Avis was a Republican member of the New Jersey General Assembly from 1902 to 1905, serving as the Speaker from 1904 to 1905. He was a member of the New Jersey Senate from 1906 to 1908. In 1912, he attended the Republican National Convention, where he was a delegate for Theodore Roosevelt.

Federal judicial service

Avis was nominated by President Herbert Hoover on September 9, 1929, to a seat on the United States District Court for the District of New Jersey vacated by Judge Joseph Lamb Bodine, who had joined the New Jersey Supreme Court. He was confirmed by the United States Senate on October 2, 1929, and received his commission the same day. His chambers were located in Camden, New Jersey. His service terminated on January 21, 1944, due to his death after an illness of two months.

Notable cases

Among Avis's most notable cases was the sentencing of Skinny D'Amato's guilty plea, and ruling on the authorship of the "Old 97" ballad, a decision eventually reversed by the United States Court of Appeals for the Third Circuit.

References

Sources
 

Judges of the United States District Court for the District of New Jersey
United States district court judges appointed by Herbert Hoover
20th-century American judges
Speakers of the New Jersey General Assembly
Republican Party members of the New Jersey General Assembly
Politicians from Woodbury, New Jersey
1875 births
1944 deaths
United States federal judges admitted to the practice of law by reading law